A statue of Junípero Serra in Capitol Park, near the California State Capitol, in Sacramento, California, was installed from 1967 until 2020. The statue was put in storage after demonstrators toppled it during a racial justice protest. In August 2021, legislators pass a bill to replace the statue with a monument to local Indigenous nations. The bill needs the signature of the governor to become law.

See also

 List of monuments and memorials removed during the George Floyd protests

References

External links
 

Buildings and structures in Sacramento, California
Sacramento, California
Monuments and memorials in California
Monuments and memorials removed during the George Floyd protests
Sculptures of men in California
Statues in California
Statues removed in 2020